The Marylebone Cricket Club tour of Australia in 1950–51 under the captaincy of Freddie Brown was its tenth since it took official control of overseas tours in 1903–1904. The touring team played as England in the 1950–51 Ashes series against Australia, but as the MCC in all other games. In all there were 25 matches; 5 Test matches (which they lost 4–1), 11 other first-class matches (which they won 4–0) and 9 minor matches (which they won 2–0). Denis Compton was made Brown's vice-captain, the only time that a professional cricketer held this position on an MCC tour.

Travelling to Australia
I suppose the day is not far distant when the players will also fly out to Australia, and this can be done in a week or even less, as evidenced by the experiences of Cyril Washbrook, Roy Tattersall and Brian Statham, who left home one week and were in Australia the next.
John Kay

The MCC touring team left Tilbury Docks on the S.S. Stratheden amidst calls to cancel the Ashes tour because of the weakness of the team led by Freddie Brown. Such critics were, of course, ignored and the team travelled in first-class luxury on the P&O liner. Though it took several weeks for them to reach Fremantle in Western Australia this method avoided jet lag and allowed the team to relax and get to know each other. The teenager Brian Close had been excused from National Service in the British Army and was particularly active in exploring the whole ship from top to bottom. Apart from the normal deck exercises some of the MCC players formed a short-lived band and Godfrey Evans gave his well-known impression of Carmen Miranda in the fancy dress party. They stopped in Ceylon for a one-day game which was drawn, but saw Arthur Macintyre make 104 and Len Hutton damage one of his fingers. They otherwise arrived safely and found that steak and fried eggs were regularly served in Australian hotels (virtually unobtainable in ration-bound Britain) and soon put on weight.

Western Australia Country vs MCC

A major part of the MCC tour was to fly the flag, promote cricket throughout Australia and earn revenue for the English counties. All these were fulfilled by playing upcountry games against local grade cricket teams and as these sides were roughly the equivalent to Lancashire League and provided the tourists with valuable practice before taking on the state sides and Australia. Later in the tour these games would pall for the players, which Freddie Brown would know all about as he was used to play these matches in 1932–33 in order to give the Test players a rest. As a result, he usually rested Len Hutton, Denis Compton and Alec Bedser and allowed the junior players to have some time at the crease. Northam was a small mining town 60 miles inland from Perth, but the mine was played out and the local economy was geared to sheep-raising and the team travelled up after regaining their land legs from their voyage. The town was decorated as if for a fête and the players were well entertained by the locals. Freddie Brown lost the toss (as he was to do in four of the Tests), but the local captain Phillips put him in to bat so that they could entertain the crowd. David Sheppard (117) and Gilbert Parkhouse (86) added 175 for the second wicket as the MCC made 329/5 declared with the local spinner K. Byfield taking 3/68. The Western Australia Country XI crashed to 89/7, but managed to survive the day and earned a draw with 113/7. Although a one-day game this was not a limited overs match and the team would have to be dismissed in order for the MCC to win, but Brown thought this was less important than time spent at the crease and left satisfied.

Western Australia Colts vs MCC

After the game at Nortam the MCC proceeded to Perth for a two-day game against the Western Australian Colts at the WACA Ground. The team was drawn from non-Sheffield Shield players and most were too old to be counted as "Colts". In any case the cricket fans of Perth were uninterested and there was only a small crowd. Nevertheless, the game provided good practice for the MCC. The Colts captain Ian Dick won the toss and elected to bat, though in this case it would have probably made little difference to the result whether he batted first for second as they were dismissed for 103 by John Warr (4/33), Eric Hollies (3/30) and Bob Berry (2/24). David Sheppard (109) overtook this total with Reg Simpson (57) as they added 126 for the first wicket with Gilbert Parkhouse adding 79 before he retired hurt and Denis Compton stoking his way to 76. Brown declared on 369/4 and soon had the Colts reeling to Compton's slow left-arm wrist-spin (4/8) and Brown's own leg-spin (3/18). They were dismissed for 117 and the MCC won by a morale boosting innings and 149 runs.

Western Australia vs MCC

From this point, the English fielding began to go downhill in no uncertain fashion. Sheppard ran round and round a skier from Carmody and did not touch it and, from having the home men 50 for three, the Englishmen allowed them to get on top completely. This is the worst fielding I had seen from an M.C.C team. Bailey emulated Sheppard by running round and round a catch, and not touching it, and Brown seemed to despair of victory...Brown left Perth stating, in a most determined manner, that his fieldsmen would know that they had had fielding practice before very long.
Jack Fingleton

Although they had won the 1947–48 Sheffield Shield Western Australia were its weakest team (Tasmania was not yet included) and isolated from the rest of Australia, so they provided an easy start for the MCC's round of state matches. The WACA Ground would not see a Test match until the 1970–71 Ashes series, so this was the only occasion for the Perth crowd to see a Test team in action. Freddie Brown won the toss and elected to bat, only to see his openers Reg Simpson and David Sheppard out for 5 runs, surprised by the swing they had been told was rare in Australia. Gilbert Parkhouse was bowled at 25/3 and it took Denis Compton (106) and John Dewes (94) to restore the innings with a partnership of 183. The vice-captain was particularity pleased with his century as it silenced the critics who thought him unfit to play and he managed to run between the wickets and step out to drive the bowlers without any fuss. Brian Close made an unbeaten 108, his maiden first-class century, although he almost walked on 91 before he found that what he had thought was a catch had taken the ball over the boundary. Godfrey Evans (43) and Alec Bedser (42) helped him hit the ball around and Brown declared on 434/9. Doug Wright proved to have one of his more productive days, but his 7/60 failed to enforce the follow on by two runs as Western Australia reached 236 thanks to their captain Doug Carmody (59) and Chris Langdon (60). The MCC hustled up 121/3 in 124 minutes before Brown declared again and set the home team 320 to win in under three hours. Bedser was confined to bed with influenza and there was no fear of a result as Western Australia made 207/4 with Tom Outridge belting 3 sixes and 9 fours in his 92 with Close suffering 3/81 off 13 overs. This was the youngster's first proper bowl and it badly affected him and destroyed his confidence to bowl on Australian pitches where he could get little movement with the ball, to the point that Brown reserved him for the country matches after the Second Test. A disgruntled Gilbert Parkhouse had been shoved into the slip cordon, where he dropped three catches and the MCC's poor fielding soon lead to them being called Brown's Cows by the Australian press.

South Australia vs MCC

When the team flew to Adelaide they were met at the airport by Test Selector Sir Donald Bradman, who had got up at 4 o'clock in the morning to meet their overnight flight, and Bill Jeanes, the secretary of the South Australian Cricket Association who happily arranged social introductions, golf and other entertainments during their stay. South Australia were stronger than Western Australia, but rarely won the Sheffield Shield and fielded no Test players, though batsman Graeme Hole and wicket-keeper Gil Langley would later play for Australia. Len Hutton had by now recovered from his finger damaged in Colombo and was reunited with his old opening partner Cyril Washbrook. Washbrook had been an original choice for the team who had declined to tour before changing his mind and being flown out to join the party. Brown won the toss again and this time put the opposition in at the Adelaide Oval on what was by tradition a flat, lifeless wicket so that he could fully test his bowlers. Allen MacLean was out for 2, but the rest of the team batted solidly and Ron Hamence making 114 as Doug Wright (4/103) worked his way expensively through the batting and Brown took 3/55 in the absence of Alec Bedser. Bob Berry was put on and took 0/33 off 12 overs, which made Brown doubt his ability, leading him to be underused for the rest of the tour. When it was their turn to bat the MCC bettered the home score by one run before Brown declared on 351/9 with nearly all the runs coming from Hutton (126) and Reg Simpson (119) adding 170 for the second wicket, Godfrey Evans reaching 38 and nobody else making 20. The game looked doomed to a draw, but the South Australia captain Ridings declared on 185/3 after Dansie had made 64 to give the MCC a sporting chance of making 185 runs in 135 minutes. Hutton was out driving for 1, but Washbrook (63) and Simpson (69) rattled up 131 in just over an hour before Evans hit six successive balls to the boundary to give his team an undeserved 7 wicket win.

Victoria vs MCC

Lindsay Hassett's Victoria was a tougher proposition, and they would win the Sheffield Shield for the 18th time that season. They also had the much vaunted "mystery spin" of Jack Iverson. Hassett as captain of both Victoria and Australia decided to play him against the England batsmen to see how they responded even though this might reveal his "secret weapon". Freddie Brown injured a finger and vice-captain Denis Compton became the first professional cricketer to captain the MCC for an entire game (Jack Hobbs took over during a match in 1924–25 when Arthur Gilligan was injured). Compton won the toss and made 107 on a good wicket with help from Len Hutton (32), Cyril Washbrook (40) and David Sheppard (28). Iverson was duly brought on and took the tailend wickets of Arthur Macintyre, John Warr and Bob Berry in his 3/85. Hassett noted that the recognised batsmen played him with due reverence and a high amount of concentration, and that he caused them trouble even though he did not threaten to take their wickets. Compton declared on 306/9 and saw the MCC total overtaken by Victoria over the course of the next two days thanks to Ron Howard (139) in his last first-class match with help from Test players Ian Johnson, (36), Doug Ring (70) and Bill Johnston (30) after Trevor Bailey (5/54) cheaply removed Ron Meuleman, Hassett, Neil Harvey, Sam Loxton and Eric Kerr. Their innings was interrupted for a day (7 November) for the Melbourne Cup, proving that "everything stops for the Melbourne Cup", or at least tour matches do. Victoria were all out for 331 on the last day and the MCC were left to bat out a pedestrian match with 79/4. Hassett was presumably satisfied with Iverson as he decided to hide him in the second innings and he did not bowl. The MCC for their part continued to live up to their billing as the worst fielding side to tour Australia.

New South Wales vs MCC

Having met half the Australian national cricket team in Melbourne Denis Compton led the MCC to meet the other half in Sydney. Alec Bedser was back in the team after his bout of flu, but probably wished he was not as the New South Wales captain Arthur Morris won the toss and batted on a flat wicket. Bedser had Jack Moroney caught behind with the score on 52, but disappeared for 1/127 off 24 overs as Morris hit 18 fours and a six in his 168. The Australian national cricket team vice-captain simply continued where he had left off in 1948, where his last two innings against England had been 182 at Headingley and 196 at the Oval. He was aided and abetted by the "glamour boy" Keith Miller who hit a chanceless 214 as the duo added 265 for the second wicket. In the end Morris was caught by Len Hutton in the slips off Trevor Bailey (1/54) and Miller was bowled by Eric Hollies (1/138), but the young Jim Burke made 80 not out before Morris declared on 509/3. In return the old firm of Len Hutton (112) and Cyril Washbrook (50) added 92 for the first MCC wicket and Hutton and Compton (92) 106 for the third wicket, seeing off the bouncers of Ray Lindwall (2/57), Alan Walker (0/30) and the young Alan Davidson (0/63). Miller did not bowl for some reason and it was the NSW spinners who took the wickets; veteran leg-spinner Freddie Johnston (6/100) wrapping up the tail with help from another youngster called Ritchie Benaud (1/75) as the last seven MCC wickets fell for 121 runs and they were all out for 339. Burke (53) and Moroney (60 not out) opened the NSW second innings adding 92 for the first wicket before Morris declared for 140/2. The MCC safely saw out the game with 142/2, Washbrook making another half-century (53 not out), Reg Simpson 32 and Compton 34 not out. Though the MCC had played reasonably well on a lifeless wicket after losing the toss the press corps still saw only their bad points, emphasising their poor fielding, first innings collapse and the inability of their bowlers to take more than 5 wickets in a tour match.

New South Wales Country vs MCC

Travelling north from Sydney to Brisbane the MCC stopped for a couple of country matches, the first in the industrial town of Newcastle, New South Wales. Len Hutton and Denis Compton had already proved their form and were rested as Freddie Brown took charge again. The first day of the match was washed out and the wicket was turning into an unpredictable mud-heap by the time the teams got to play. The local captain was Bob Beatty who had played against the MCC in 1936–37 under Gubby Allen and 1946–57 under Wally Hammond and made 69 in his teams 169 as Eric Hollies took a flattering 5/39 and Bob Berry 4/45 on a real turner. The MCC provided more material to the Australian Press by collapsing to a fast bowler called John Bull, who took 6/24 with the help of some good catching and had the tourists 37/4. They reached 142 all out thanks to the pugnacious John Dewes who made 71, with nobody else making more than Reg Simpson's 23. To concede a 27 run first innings deficit to a club side was an embarrassment, but given the state of the pitch it was not as bad as some critics made out. On the "sticky dogs" and "glue-pots" produced by uncovered wickets only the best batsmen could hope to make runs against any competent bowling attack.

Northern New South Wales vs MCC

The MCC had a more enjoyable time at Lismore, New South Wales, near the border with Queensland. Unlike Newcastle this was in the open countryside and the players took advantage of the town's generous hospitality and the free membership of the local golf courses. David Sheppard (52), Reg Simpson (66) and John Dewes (50) made some easy runs in the MCC's 274 on the first day. One of the umpires so forgot himself that he led the appeals against the MCC captain when he was rapped on the pads then raised his arm to give him out lbw. The English bowlers shared the wickets in the Northern NSW's reply of 156. A hundred runs ahead Freddie Brown enforced the follow on, but the last afternoon was played easily and they did not press for victory after having the local team made 21/2 and they finished a happily played game on 55/2.

Queensland vs MCC

If ever there was need for an encouraging show, the M.C.C. needed one against Queensland, in the game that served as a curtain-raiser to the Test, but, instead the standard of cricket fell to a new low level...
John Kay

With only one game before the First Test Brown's men had to improve their form dramatically if they wanted to stand a chance against the powerful Australian team. Instead they conceded another first innings deficit to a weak Sheffield Shield team. the wicket-keeper-captain Don Tallon won the toss and batted and the MCC bowlers did quite well in the circumstances, Alec Bedser (3/40) and John Warr (3/70) having Queensland 23/2, but whatever good work they did was undone by slack fielding, poor catching and some new batsman making runs. Ken Archer (63), who would make his Test debut in the series added 120 with Aubrey Carrigan (100) and Ernest Toovey (58 not out) added 81 for the ninth wicket with Lawrence Chapman (38). The second day was rained off as they batted into the third day for 305. The local swing bowler Len Johnson took 6/66 in an innings of 291 that relied almost entirely on Cyril Washbrook (82) and John Dewes (117), both fighting their way back into form and jeered by the crowd as they ground out their unsightly innings. With Denis Compton making a dull 28 in 100 minutes and nobody else making 15 by the time they had finished only three overs could be bowled before stumps, but Warr picked up a wicket for no runs. The press were unsympathetic and with rumours that Hutton (damaged finger), Denis Compton (swollen knee) and Alec Bedser (influenza) were all ill or injured some wondered if the Test was worth playing. There were also the usual stories of dissension in the ranks whenever a team performs badly, which Brown hotly denied, thus providing a new story. In truth Brown ran a happy ship and allowed the team more socialising than previous captains. He also saw no reason why he should force amateur undergraduates to mix awkwardly with working class professionals, or that veterans should accompany their younger team-mates.

First Test – Brisbane

See Main Article – 1950–51 Ashes series

Queensland Country vs MCC

After the fireworks of the First Test the MCC team drove to Toowoomba with their reputation much enhanced by their performance and were welcomed as heroes. Rugby league was strong in Queensland's largest inland town and the genial John Bapty, who covered both rugby and cricket in the Yorkshire Evening Post, gave a speech of thanks after a dinner was given for the Lancastrians and Yorkshiremen in the team. The MCC belted 428/6 off 54.5 overs against light-hearted bowling with David Sheppard (72), Reg Simpson (98), Gilbert Parkhouse (57), acting captain Denis Compton (92) and wicket-keeper Godfrey Evans (94) helping themselves, but Brian Close going for a duck. Compton declared in the afternoon and the Queensland Country XI were 88/3 by stumps and 220 all out the next day with captain Tom Allen hitting 2 sixes and 10 fours in his top-scoring 83 as Doug Wright (5/52) and Eric Hollies (3/33) served up old-fashioned leg-spin. Rather that enforce the follow on and going for a win Compton good-naturedly put on another batting display and the MCC hit 297/7 off the remaining 37 overs of the day. Sheppard made 42, Parkhouse 58 and even the stonewaller Trevor Bailey gave the bowling the long handle with 68 not out, but Close bagged a pair.

Southern New South Wales vs MCC

The team flew to the Australian Capital Territory for another two-day game in Canberra. This proved to be not as enjoyable as the last, the opposition was made up of old sweats rather than young hopefuls and few turned up to watch. The pitch was less friendly too and the MCC, batting first, struggled to 180 with Cyril Washbrook making 49 batting at number 6, Trevor Bailey 43 not out at number 8 and a medium paced bowler by the name of Robinson from Wagga Wagga making his name by taking 5/40. This time the MCC managed to gain a first innings lead of 16 as Bailey took 4/39 and Doug Wright 3/43 with another Wagga Wagga man called Hedditch making 52 not out. Time was running out and after Len Hutton made 54 David Sheppard and Brian Close smashed an unbeaten third wicket partnership of 179, being fed long hops and full tosses so that they could make their centuries before stumps. The prime minister of Australia, Robert Menzies, "a keen cricket enthusiast and a supporter of the game at all times, asked the team round to Parliament House at Canberra". Unlike other the government functions in Australia, the press corps were also invited.

Australian XI vs MCC

The Australia XI match against the MCC used to be seen as virtually another Test match and important for the Australian selectors to see up and coming cricketers in action before choosing a team. For some reason in 1950–51 it was scheduled between the First and Second Tests and after the team for the latter had already been announced. Even if someone made a century or took ten wickets they could not be picked for the Australian team until the Third Test early in 1951, though Ken Archer and Jim Burke had been named in the XII and were fighting to avoid being the twelfth man. The game was held in Sydney as their rivals Melbourne were hosting two of the Tests. The Australian vice captain Arthur Morris was in charge on his home ground with local hero Keith Miller and the Victorian Neil Harvey who hardly needed testing. The batsmen Graeme Hole, wicket-keeper Gil Langley and bowlers Alan Walker, Geoff Noblet and Chris Langdon were also included, as was Ritchie Benaud, but he was too ill to play and was replaced by the veteran leg-spinner Doug Ring. Morris won the toss again and batted on a flat Sydney wicket, he added 170 with Ken Archer (81) before he was out for exactly 100, Harvey (40), Miller (62), Burke (128) and Hole (41) piled up the runs and Morris declared during the second day's tea interval for 526/9. John Warr (2/89) opened the bowling, Alec Bedser and Freddie Brown failed to take a wicket and Eric Hollies (3/108) and Bob Berry (2/108 off just 14 overs) could not contain the attack. The two spinners could not blame the fielding as they each dropped Morris of their own bowling, and Berry dropping him off Hollies. Alan Walker (5/60) and Doug Ring (3/106) reduced the MCC's reply to 47/3 by stumps and it was up to Denis Compton (115) and nightwatchman Godfrey Evans (31) to restore the innings with a partnership of 85, followed by another of 130 between Compton and Gilbert Parkhouse (58). Burke added to his credentials be taking a great catch in gully to dismiss a tired Compton, leaving Brown to punch 46 before the tail gave way five runs short of saving the follow on. Morris sent the MCC back in to bat and saw them fall to 22/2 before John Dewes (66 not out) and Parkhouse (46 not out) saved the day. Dewes retired hurt at 66/2, but returned after Compton was dismissed for 29 and they ended on 173/3. Although Jim Burke made the most runs he carried the drinks in the Second Test and Archer opened with Morris, but Burke was chosen for the Fourth Test at Adelaide and made a century on debut. Langley proved to be a competent keeper, but failed to oust Don Tallon despite the latter's lack of form. The results for Freddie Brown were more dire, Compton's knee had swollen again due to his exertions and he was unfit to play at Melbourne, Berry and Hollies had proved incapable of containing the Australian batsmen and Bedser and Brown has lost the form which had caught Australia out at Brisbane. The only good news was that John Dewes had shown his fighting abilities regardless of form and a fair crowd had come to watch, so increasing coffers of the MCC Manager John Nash.

Second Test – Melbourne

See Main Article – 1950–51 Ashes series

New South Wales vs MCC

M.C.C. could barely field a team for the return game against N.S.W. in Sydney. Dewes had not recovered from influenza; Close had a groin strain; McIntyre had pulled a muscle; Compton had an "eye" as well as a "knee" to nurse; and Warr left the field with a jarred tendon after bowling five overs. Brown opened the bowling with the new ball and Brigadier Green, with military precision, brought out the drinks.
Jack Fingleton
Even though they lost the Second Test the reputation of the MCC rose again as they fought Australia to a thrilling 28 run finish. They returned to Sydney and played their second game against the strong New South Wales team in preparation for the Third Test. For the third time in a row the New South Wales captain Arthur Morris won the toss and batted on the flat Sydney wicket. On the two previous occasions his team amassed 509/3 and 526/9, but this time they were bowled out for 333 despite a third century from Morris (105), who hit two sixes and 9 fours regardless of his poor form as Bedser's Bunny in the Tests. Keith Miller hit 3 sixes and 7 fours in his 98, but "puzzled the crowd by frequent periods when he would not be tempted into hitting anything, while on other occasions he burst out into hitting spells". Doug Wright (3/98) removed both these giants in his own inimitable way and John Warr (4/74) cleaned up the tail with only Jim de Courcy making any headway with 72 not out. In response Ray Lindwall (1/76) and Alan Walker (1/98) removed Cyril Washbrook and David Sheppard and the MCC were 17/2, but this brought together Len Hutton and Reg Simpson. Hutton, usually so defensive, began to cream the spinners through the covers, making 150 of the first 253 runs in little over three hours when he tired of the sport, walked down the pitch to the pavilion and was stumped off Fred Johnston (2/166) without looking back. Simpson batted for over nine hours compiling his highest ever first-class score of 259, adding 236 runs with Hutton and 228 with Gilbert Parkhouse (92). Leg-spinner Reg Madden (3/93) removed Parkhouse, Brown (0) and Evans (2) and when Simpson fell to the part-time off-spin of Jim Burke (1/32) the innings was declared at 553/5, 220 runs ahead. There was little time to finish the match, but New South Wales collapsed 31/5 to Warr (2/25) and Brown (3/24). Burke (40) and Jack Moroney (51 not out) added 90 runs for the sixth wicket and saved the day, stumps being drawn at 130/6. For the first time on the tour the English batsmen had held clear dominance over the Australians and it boded well for the upcoming Test.

Third Test – Sydney

See Main Article – 1950–51 Ashes series

Tasmania vs MCC

In Tasmania, the Hobart officials inflicted upon their visitors an eighteen-year-old umpire, whose claim to be the youngest to officiate in a first class game was marred by a childish display of temperament...young Terry Lynch called each and every bowler to order for no-balling. He also checked Denis Compton for short runs and gave the Middlesex man run out when he was past the stumps and still taking it easy.
John Kay

Some of the oldest grade clubs in Australia are in Tasmania, but it was a weak state side that would not fully complete in the Sheffield Shield for another 25 years. Freddie Brown took a holiday in Victoria, Len Hutton went on a cruise to Sydney and Doug Wright took a break as well. Alec Bedser's identical twin brother Eric was in Australia on business (they were inseparable and lived together for 90 years) and was asked to help the MCC rest some of its players after the injuries and fatigue of the Third Test. Alec and Eric tossed a coin in their youth to see who would remain a fast bowler so that they could both get into the Surrey Colts, Eric lost and became an opening batsman and off-spinner. As always the Tasmanians were delighted to meet the MCC team and their stay on the island was always regarded as the most pleasant part of the tour. Tom Davidson won the toss for Tasmania, but they batted haphazardly towards 197 as John Warr (4/47) and Alec Bedser (4/56) worked their way through the team. The hero of the day was Keith Dollery (3/30), "a fast-medium bowler who bowls with his cap on and touches the ground for luck with his finger before he takes off" who removed the MCC openers David Sheppard and John Dewes and was carried off the field by his team-mates as the tourists were struggled to 18/2 at stumps. He had nightwatchman Godfrey Evans out in the morning for 28/3, but Reg Simpson (28), captain Denis Compton (41), Cyril Washbrook (61) and Alec Bedser (35) righted the ship and the MCC made 234, a lead of 42 runs. Tasmania did better second time round and reached 209/4 with Compton disappearing for 2/72 off 11 overs before Alec Bedser (4/30) and Warr (3/39) finished off the tail and the last six wickets fell for 20 runs. This left the MCC 187 runs to win in 135 minutes. This was achieved thanks to Sheppard (67 not out), Simpson (43) and Compton (77 not out), who hit the last six balls to the boundary before an enthusiastic crowd.

Tasmania Combined XI vs MCC

The MCC drove to Launceston by the beautiful Great Lake of Tasmania for a game against a Tasmanian Combined XI. In this the Tasmanian team were stiffen by the presence of Arthur Morris, Graeme Hole, Jim de Courcy and Geoff Noblet from the mainland. Jack Lever won the toss and the Combined XI batted first, but Morris was "Bedser's Bunny" again as the big Surrey bowler took 5/54 in what some thought was his best bowling, the ball continually beating the bat, but bad luck denying him wickets. Only Graeme Hole (105) made any headway with some late-order hitting from Laver (59) bringing them up to a respectable 289. The MCC opened steadily, but the fireworks came from captain Denis Compton (142) and veteran Cyril Washbrook (112) who added 200 runs for the fourth wicket. Gilbert Parkhouse made 44 and Compton declared for 382/7 on their overnight score. Bedser (2/29) accounted for both the openers and the rest of the team fell to the leg-spin of Eric Hollies (4/7) and slow left-arm wrist-spin of Compton himself (3/39) and they were out for 103 in the rain. The weather cleared up in time for the MCC to make the 10 runs for a clear ten wicket victory. After the match Compton remarked "What a pity that they don't play Tests in Tasmania".

South Australia Country vs MCC

Brian Statham and Roy Tattersall had just arrived from snowbound Lancashire and were thrown into this minor game to get their first cricket since September. They each took a wicket, but the honours belonged to the previously underperforming Bob Berry who returned figures of 6/36 as the South Australian team were shot out for 84. The real shock occurred when a blonde fast bowler called Lou Curtis – ironically from Berri, South Australia – took 5 wickets before stumps after David Sheppard (37) and Reg Simpson (30) added 60 for the first wicket. He continued the next day and took 9/60 despite Denis Compton making 40 and Freddie Brown a punchy 77 to take the MCC to 234 and a lead of 150. This proved to be enough as the Country XI were out for 124, the wickets shared around the team. Tim Wall the South Australian state selector invited Curtis to the Adelaide Oval for a state trial, but he refused as he had to return to his wheat farm. "The cricket season", he explained "is the busiest time on the farm, especially with the harvesting. I don't intend to leave my brothers to it and go and play cricket".

South Australia vs MCC

The Adelaide Oval is usually a flat, lifeless wicket where the fastest bowlers could rarely get the ball to rise above knee level and looked fit for a thousand runs. Freddie Brown won the toss and sent Len Hutton and Cyril Washbrook out the bat. The Yorkshireman was back at 31/1 and said that the wicket was turning so much that they would be lucky to make 250. He wasn't just saving his blushes as the fast-medium seamer Geoff Noblet took 5/54 in the searing heat and Slow Left Armer John Wilson 3/39 as the MCC were out for 211 with no batsman making 30 except Washbrook (32) and David Sheppard (32) at the start of the innings. The heat badly affected the South Australians with only Neil Dansie (44) made any headway as Eric Hollies took 3/16, Roy Tattersall (2/32) and Doug Wright (2/39) and Freddie Brown (1/1) spun them out for 126. Hutton (66) and Washbrook (45) added 112 for the first wicket in the MCC's reply of 220 with the leg-breaks of Allan McLean (5/68) cleaning up the tail after Noblet (3/39) helped remove the first three batsmen. Even so, 306 runs to win was too much for South Australia as they collapsed to 152 all out after being 90/1 with Dansie (42) top scoring again and Wright taking 5/57. This was the MCC's second win over South Australia and their fourth win in a row since the Third Test, so they had high hopes for Adelaide.

Fourth Test – Adelaide

See Main Article – 1950–51 Ashes series

Victoria vs MCC

In the penultimate First Class match of the tour Freddie Brown was still recovering from his car crash during the Fourth Test, and John Warr, Alec Bedser and Doug Wright were given a rest and Denis Compton had only Trevor Bailey (1/74), nursing his freshly healed broken finger, the young Brian Statham (1/47) and the out of form Brian Close (3/103), Eric Hollies (3/107) and Bob Berry (2/92). Lindsay Hassett took full advantage by making 232 after winning the toss – his highest First Class century – but no one else did except Doug Ring who made 74 as they added 166 for the seventh wicket. Hassett batted well into the second day finishing his century, which pretty much condemned the match to a draw on such a good wicket. The MCC made 414 thanks to Len Hutton (128) and Bailey (125) as Jack Iverson was recovering from a damaged ankle and the only bowlers of quality were Bill Johnston (2/68), Doug Ring (5/134) and Ian Johnson (1/10), the last bowling the out of form Compton with a full toss for 20. Colin MacDonald (26) and Neil Harvey (56) made an opening stand of 56 as the South Australians batted out the game with an innings of 234, leaving the MCC 15 minutes to make 36/1.

Victoria Country vs MCC

The last two minor games in Victoria we squeezed in between the Victorian match and the Fifth Test, and the tourists were now tiring of this extra work. Freddie Brown was still recovering from his car accident and Denis Compton badly needed to rest his knee. The captaincy devolved first onto Cyril Washbrook and as none of the young amateurs showed any signs of leadership. As it happened The Country XI won the toss and batted against a lacklustre MCC attack, making 217/7 before the game was washed out.

Victoria Country vs MCC

Len Hutton was in charge of the last minor game, won the toss and decided to field. Brian Statham 3/35, Doug Wright 4/39 and Roy Tattersall 3/11 made short work of the Country XI, who were out for 97. The MCC reached 60/0 with Hutton 40 not out when the rain came down and the match was abandoned.

Fifth Test – Melbourne

See Main Article – 1950–51 Ashes series

First Class Tour Averages
Source As was the convention of the time, gentleman amateurs have their initials in front of their surname and professional players have their initials after their name, if used at all.

References

Bibliography
 J.H. Fingleton, Brown and Company, The Tour in Australia, Collins, 1951
 John Kay, Ashes to Hassett, A review of the M.C.C. tour of Australia, 1950–51, John Sherratt & Son, 1951
 W.J. O'Reilly, Cricket Task-Force, The Story of the 1950–51 Australian Tour, Werner Laurie, 1951
 E.W. Swanton, Swanton in Australia with MCC 1946–1975, Fontana/Collins, 1975

External links
 CricketArchive tour itinerary

1950 in Australian cricket
1950 in English cricket
1951 in Australian cricket
1951 in English cricket
Australian cricket seasons from 1945–46 to 1969–70
English cricket tours of Australia
International cricket competitions from 1945–46 to 1960
Australia 1950-51